Viacom18 Studios, a subsidiary of Viacom18 (a Paramount Networks EMEAA and Network18 joint venture) based in Mumbai, is one of the first studio model based motion picture & content production business in India, with an operation that involves acquisition, production, syndication, marketing and worldwide distribution of full-length feature films as well as digital only films, web series, short films.  Due to Viacom owning half the company, Viacom18 Motion Pictures also distributes films from Paramount Pictures in India, Bangladesh, and Sri Lanka since 2011, starting with Transformers: Dark of the Moon.

Filmography

Films produced

Films distributed

Web series

References

External links
 
 Viacom18 Motion Pictures at Bollywood Hungama

Network18 Group
Film production companies based in Mumbai
 
Indian subsidiaries of foreign companies